Tarqideh (also Romanized as Tarqīdeh; also known as Tarkīdeh) is a village in Juyom Rural District, Juyom District, Larestan County, Fars Province, Iran. At the 2006 census, its population was 32, in 6 families.

References 

Populated places in Larestan County